Cadet Corps or Corps of Cadets is a type of military school. It may also refer to:

Military education 

 Cadet Corps (Russia), a type of military school in Russia
 Corps of Cadets (Warsaw), a school in the Polish-Lithuanian Commonwealth
 California Cadet Corps, a paramilitary youth organization
 The Corps of Cadets at the United States Military Academy
 The Corps of Cadets at University of North Georgia
 South Carolina Corps of Cadets, the Corps of Cadets at The Citadel, The Military College of South Carolina
 Texas A&M University Corps of Cadets
 Virginia Tech Corps of Cadets
 The Corps of Cadets at Fork Union Military Academy
 The Corps of Cadets at Marine Military Academy
 The Corps of Cadets at Norwich University
 The Corps of Cadets at California Maritime Academy

United Kingdom
 Volunteer Cadet Corps

See also 
 National Cadet Corps (disambiguation)